was a Japanese football player and manager. He played for Japan national team.

Club career
Yaegashi was born in Daejeon, Japan on March 24, 1933, but raised in Hanamaki. After playing at Chuo University, he moved to Waseda University. After graduating from Waseda University, he joined Furukawa Electric in 1958. In 1963, he was selected Japanese Footballer of the Year awards. In 1965, Furukawa Electric joined new league Japan Soccer League. He retired in 1969. He played 51 games and scored 14 goals in the league. He was also selected Best Eleven 3 times (1966, 1967 and 1968).

National team career
In June 1956, when Yaegashi was a Waseda University student, he was selected Japan national team for 1956 Summer Olympics qualification. At this qualification, on June 3, he debuted against South Korea. In November, he played at 1956 Summer Olympics in Melbourne. He also played at 1964 Summer Olympics in Tokyo and 1968 Summer Olympics in Mexico City. At 1968 Olympics, he played as a captain in first match against Nigeria, he was replaced for injury in the 78minuts. This match is his last match for Japan. After the match, Although he could not play, he supported Japan team and Japan won bronze medal. In 2018, this team was selected Japan Football Hall of Fame. He also played at 1958, 1962 and 1966 Asian Games. He played 45 games and scored 11 goals for Japan until 1968.

Coaching career
In 1967, when Yaegashi played for Furukawa Electric, he became a playing manager as Ryuzo Hiraki successor for the club and managed in 1 season. After retirement, he also managed for Fujitsu 2 times (1977–1981 and 1985–1989).

In 2005, Yaegashi was selected Japan Football Hall of Fame. On May 2, 2011, he died of cerebral infarction in Tama at the age of 78.

National team statistics

Awards
 Japanese Football Player of Year: 1963
 Japan Soccer League Best Eleven: (3) 1966, 1967, 1968

References

External links
 
 
 Japan National Football Team Database
 Japan Football Hall of Fame at Japan Football Association
Japan Football Hall of Fame (Japan team at 1968 Olympics) at Japan Football Association
 

1933 births
2011 deaths
Chuo University alumni
Waseda University alumni
People from Hanamaki, Iwate
People from Tama, Tokyo
Association football people from Iwate Prefecture
Association football people from Tokyo Metropolis
Japanese footballers
Japan international footballers
Japan Soccer League players
JEF United Chiba players
Japanese football managers
Player-coaches
Olympic footballers of Japan
Footballers at the 1956 Summer Olympics
Footballers at the 1964 Summer Olympics
Footballers at the 1968 Summer Olympics
Olympic bronze medalists for Japan
Medalists at the 1968 Summer Olympics
Olympic medalists in football
Asian Games medalists in football
Footballers at the 1958 Asian Games
Footballers at the 1962 Asian Games
Footballers at the 1966 Asian Games
Association football midfielders
Asian Games bronze medalists for Japan
Medalists at the 1966 Asian Games